Ingrid Gebauer (born 13 February 1959) is a German footballer. She played in three matches for the Germany women's national football team from 1982 to 1983.

References

External links
 

1959 births
Living people
German women's footballers
Germany women's international footballers
Place of birth missing (living people)
Women's association footballers not categorized by position